Zinc finger protein 772 is a protein that in humans is encoded by the ZNF772 gene.

References